Free Bricks 2: Zone 6 Edition is a collaborative EP by American rappers Gucci Mane and Future. It was released on November 14, 2016. The EP features production by Southside, London on da Track, Metro Boomin and Zaytoven. It is a follow up to their 2011 mixtape Free Bricks.

Track listing

References

2016 EPs
Gucci Mane albums
Future (rapper) albums
Collaborative albums
Albums produced by Southside (record producer)
Albums produced by Zaytoven
Albums produced by London on da Track
Albums produced by Metro Boomin
Hip hop EPs
EPs by American artists